Backpacking is the outdoor recreation of carrying gear on one's back, while hiking for more than a day. It is often an extended journey, and may involve camping outdoors. In North America tenting is common, where simple shelters and mountain huts, widely found in Europe, are rare. In New Zealand, hiking is called tramping and tents are used alongside a nationwide network of huts. Hill walking is an equivalent in Britain (but this can also refer to a day walk), though backpackers make use of a variety of accommodation, in addition to camping. Backpackers use simple huts in South Africa. Trekking and bushwalking are other words used to describe such multi-day trips.

Backpacking as a method of travel is a different activity, which mainly uses public transport during a journey which can last months.

Definition

Backpacking is an outdoor recreation where gear is carried in a backpack. This can include food, water, bedding, shelter, clothing, stove, and cooking kit. Given that backpackers must carry their gear, the total weight of their bag and its contents is a primary concern of backpackers. Backpacking trips range from one night to weeks or months, sometimes aided by planned resupply points, drops, or caches.

Accommodations

Backpacking camps are usually more spartan than campsites where gear is transported by car or boat. In areas with heavy backpacker traffic, a hike-in campsite might have a fire ring (where permissible), an outhouse, a wooden bulletin board with a map and information about the trail and area. Many hike-in camps are no more than level patches of ground free of underbrush. In remote wilderness areas hikers must choose their own site. Established camps are rare and the ethos is to "leave no trace" when gone.

In some regions, varying forms of accommodation exist, from simple log lean-to's to staffed facilities offering escalating degrees of service. Beds, meals, and even drinks may be had at Alpine huts scattered among well-traveled European mountains. Backpackers there can walk from hut-to-hut without leaving the mountains, while in places like the Lake District or Yorkshire Dales in England hill-walkers descend to stay in youth hostels, farmhouses or guest houses. Reservations can usually be made in advance and are recommended in the high season.

In the more remote parts of Great Britain, especially Scotland, bothies exist to provide simple (free) accommodation for backpackers. On the French system of long distance trails, Grande Randonnées, backpackers can stay in gîtes d'étapes, which are simple hostels provided for walkers and cyclists. There are some simple shelters and occasional mountain hut also provided in North America, including on the Appalachian Trail. Another example is the High Sierra Camps in the Yosemite National Park. Long-distance backpacking trails with huts also exist in South Africa, including the 100 km plus Amatola Trail, in the Eastern Cape Province. Backpacking is also popular in the Himalayas (often called trekking there), where porters and pack animals are often used.

Equipment 

Backpacking gear depends on the terrain and climate, and on a hiker's plans for shelter (refuges, huts, gites, camping, etc.). It may include:

A backpack of appropriate size. Backpacks can include frameless, external frame, internal frame, and bodypack styles.
Clothing and footwear appropriate for the conditions.
Food and a means to prepare it (stove, utensils, pot, etc.).
Sleep system such as a sleeping bag and a pad.
Survival gear.
A shelter such as a tent, tarp or bivouac sack.
Water containers and purifiers.

Water 

Proper hydration is critical to successful backpacking. Depending on conditions - which include weather, terrain, load, and the hiker's age and fitness - a backpacker may drink 2 to 8 litres (1/2 to 2 gallons), or more, per day. It is impossible to carry more than a few days' supply. Therefore, hikers often drink natural water supplies, sometimes after filtering or purifying.

Some hikers will treat water before drinking to protect against waterborne diseases carried by bacteria and protozoa. The chief treatment methods include:

 Boiling
 Treatment with chemicals such as chlorine or iodine
 Filtering (often used with chemical treatments)
 Treatment with ultraviolet light

Water may be stored in bottles or collapsible plastic bladders. Hydration bladders are increasingly popular.

Food

Backpacking is energy intensive.  It is essential to bring enough food to maintain both energy and health. The weight of food is an important issue to consider. Consequently, items with high food energy, long shelf life, and low mass and volume deliver the most utility. Taste and satisfaction are issues that are of varying importance to individual hikers, as they consider whether it's worth the effort (and trade-off against other gear) to carry fresh, heavy, or luxury food items.  The shorter the trip and easier the conditions the more feasible such treats become.

In many cases, heat, fuel and utensils are used. Small liquid or gas-fueled campstoves and lightweight cooking pots are common. Campfires are sometimes prohibited.

Some backpackers consume dried foods, including many common household foods such as cereal, oatmeal, powdered milk, cheese, crackers, sausage, salami, dried fruit, peanut butter, pasta and rice. Popular snacks include trail mix, easily prepared at home; nuts, energy bars, chocolate, and other energy-dense foods. Coffee, tea, and cocoa are common beverages.
ackage food in plastic bags while avoiding heavier jars and cans. Dehydrators are popular for drying fruit, jerky, and pre-cooked meals.

Many hikers use freeze-dried precooked entrees for hot meals, quickly reconstituted by adding boiling water. An alternative is Ultra High Temperature (UHT) processed food, which has its moisture retained and merely needs heating with a special, water-activated chemical reaction.

Specialized cookbooks are available on trailside food and the challenges inherent in making it. Some focus on planning meals and preparing ingredients for short trips; others on the challenges of organizing and preparing meals revolving around the bulk rationing prevalent in extended trail hikes, particularly those with pre-planned food drops.

Lightweight-hiking

Some people seek out lighter equipment for long-distance hikes, as it is easier to carry. Specialist lightweight gear is widely available, but can be expensive. Materials can include carbon fiber, lightweight alloys, specialty plastics, and impregnated fabrics.

Skills and safety 

 Survival skills can provide peace of mind and may make the difference between life and death when the weather, terrain, or environment turns unexpectedly for the worse.
 Navigation and orienteering are useful to find the trailhead, then find and follow a route to a desired sequence of destinations, and then an exit.  In case of disorientation, orienteering skills are important to determine the current location and formulate a route to somewhere more desirable.  At their most basic, navigation skills allow one to choose the correct sequence of trails to follow. In situations where a trail or clear line-of-sight to the desired destination is not present, navigation and orienteering allow the backpacker to understand the terrain and wilderness around them and, using their tools and practices, select the appropriate direction to hike. Weather (rain, fog, snow), terrain (hilly, rock faces, dense forest), and hiker experience can all impact and increase the challenges to navigation in the wilderness.
 First aid: effectively dealing with minor injuries (splinters, punctures, sprains) is considered by many a fundamental backcountry skill.  More subtle, but maybe even more important, is recognizing and promptly treating hypothermia, heat stroke, dehydration and hypoxia, as these are rarely encountered in daily life.
 Leave No Trace is the backpacker's version of the golden rule: To have beautiful and pristine places to enjoy, help make them.  At a minimum, don't make them worse.
 Distress signaling is a skill of last resort.

Related activities

Winter backpacking

Winter backpacking requires a higher level of skill and generally more specialized gear than in other seasons. Skis or snowshoes may be required to traverse deep snow, or crampons and an ice axe where needed. Winter sleeping bags and tents are essential, as are waterproof, water-repellent, and moisture dissipating materials. Cotton clothing retains moisture and chills the body, both particularly dangerous in cold weather.  Winter backpackers stick to wool or synthetic fabric like nylon or polypropylene, which hold less moisture and often have specialized wicking properties to dissipate sweat generated during aerobic activities. Layering is essential, as wet clothes quickly sap body heat and can lead to frostbite or hypothermia.

A winter bivouac can also be made in a snow cave. It has thermal properties similar to an igloo and is effective both at providing protection from wind and low temperatures.  A properly made snow cave can be 0 °C (32 °F) or warmer inside, even when outside temperatures are −40 °C (−40 °F).
It is constructed by excavating snow so that its entrance tunnel is below the main space in order to retain warm air.  Construction is simplified by building on a steep slope and digging slightly upwards and horizontally into the snow.  The roof is domed to prevent dripping on the occupants.  Adequate snow depth, free of rocks and ice, is needed — generally  is sufficient. A quinzhee is similar, but constructed by tunneling into mounded snow rather than by digging into a natural snow formation.

Fastpacking

Fastpacking is a recreational activity that combines lightweight backpacking with running, and, on steep slopes, hiking. It is a multi-day adventure that usually takes places along long distance trails. A sleeping bag is carried and other essential backpacking items, and often a tent or similar shelter, if places to stay are not available.

Other

 Canoe and kayak camping
 Bicycle touring and its lightweight variant bikepacking
 Trail riding, where gear is carried in saddlebags
 Backpacking (travel), where public transport is used to visit cultural attractions, rather than natural ones, though it may also include wilderness side trips.
 Adventure travel, tourism in a highly unpredictable or hazardous region or environment.
 Thru-hiking, traversing a long-distance trail in a single, continuous journey.
 Ultralight backpacking, which minimizes both weight and amount of gear carried, typically employed in highly aerobic back-country pursuits.
 Wilderness survival

See also

References

External links 
 American Hiking Society Preserves and protects hiking trails and the hiking experience
 Leave No Trace - The Leave No Trace Center for Outdoor Ethics is an educational, nonprofit organization dedicated to the responsible enjoyment and active stewardship of the outdoors by all people, worldwide.

Scoutcraft
Hiking

ja:トレッキング
sv:Vandring
chy:Amo'xestôtse